The Consortium on Financing Higher Education (COFHE) is an organization of thirty-nine private colleges and universities. Formed in the mid-1970s, COFHE is an unincorporated, voluntary, institutionally-supported organization of 39 highly selective, private liberal arts colleges and universities,  all of which are committed to meeting the full demonstrated financial need of admitted students.

The Consortium’s data collection, research, and policy analysis focus on matters pertaining to access, affordability, and assessment, particularly as they relate to undergraduate education, admissions, financial aid, and the financing of higher education. All data supplied to, compiled by, and shared among the Consortium are subject to strict confidentiality guidelines.  
   
The organization's officially stated goals are as follows:

Collecting from and reporting to the member institutions historical data relating to admission, financial aid, and costs.
Conducting periodic and special studies, as desired, to investigate aspects of institutional policy and administrative practices.
Convening meetings of the membership for general policy and research discussions of broad interest and import.
Monitoring developments within the federal government and the private sector as these developments relate to the financing of higher education, with specific emphasis on financial aid and student loan programs.
Cooperating and coordinating with other organizations concerned with higher education.

COFHE's home office is located at the Massachusetts Institute of Technology in Cambridge, Massachusetts, and a Washington office is housed at Johns Hopkins's Paul H. Nitze School of Advanced International Studies in the District of Columbia. The president of COFHE as of November 1, 2018 is Janet Rapelye.  From 2002 to October 2018, the president was Kristine Dillon. Preceding her was Katharine Hanson, 1976-2002.

Members
Amherst College
Barnard College
Bowdoin College
Brown University
Bryn Mawr College
California Institute of Technology
Carleton College
Columbia University
Cornell University
Dartmouth College
Duke University
Emory University
Georgetown University 
Harvard University 
Haverford College
Johns Hopkins University
Macalester College
Massachusetts Institute of Technology
Middlebury College
Mount Holyoke College
Northwestern University
Oberlin College
Pomona College
Princeton University 
Rice University
Smith College 
Stanford University 
Swarthmore College 
Trinity College 
University of Chicago
University of Pennsylvania
University of Rochester
Vanderbilt University
Vassar College
Washington University in St. Louis
Wellesley College 
Wesleyan University 
Williams College 
Yale University

External links
The official COFHE website

Student financial aid in the United States